Tityridae is family of suboscine passerine birds found in forest and woodland in the Neotropics. The 45 species in this family were formerly spread over the families Tyrannidae, Pipridae and Cotingidae (see Taxonomy). As yet, no widely accepted common name exists for the family, although tityras and allies and tityras, mourners and allies have been used. They are small to medium-sized birds. Most have relatively short tails and large heads.

Taxonomy and systematics
The family Tityridae (as the subfamily Tityrinae) containing the genera Tityra and Pachyramphus was introduced by the English zoologist George Robert Gray in 1840.

Traditionally, the genus Laniocera was included in the family Tyrannidae, the genera Iodopleura, Laniisoma, Tityra, Pachyramphus and Xenopsaris were included in the family Cotingidae, and Schiffornis was included in the family Pipridae. Three of these genera, Tityra, Pachyramphus and Xenopsaris, were later moved to Tyrannidae based on the morphology of their skull and syrinx.

The existence of the family Tityridae (although simply treated as a clade) was first proposed in 1989 based on the morphology of several syringeal and skeletal features. The existence of this family has later been confirmed by multiple studies involving both mitochondrial DNA and nuclear DNA. Evidence suggests there are two basal clades within this family, the first including the genera Schiffornis, Laniocera, and Laniisoma (with strong bootstrap support), and the second include Iodopleura, Tityra, Xenopsaris, and Pachyramphus (with poor bootstrap support).

A molecular phylogenetic study of passerine families published in 2019 sampled species from five genera in Tityridae. The resulting tree indicates that if the family Tityridae is defined to include the genera Oxyruncus, Myiobius and Onychorhynchus then it becomes paraphyletic: a clade containing the genera Tityra and Schiffornis is basal to a clade that contains the genera Oxyruncus, Myiobius, Onychorhynchus and the family Tyrannidae.

Species
The family contains 45 species divided into 11 genera:

References

 
Bird families
Tyranni
Taxa named by George Robert Gray
andnbsp;